John D. Graf (born December 3, 1968) is a former Canadian national rugby player. He had the unique distinction of being capped at five  positions: wing, center, full back, fly-half and scrum-half.

Graf debuted for Canada against an Ireland XV, in Victoria, on September 2, 1989. He also played the 1991, 1995 and 1999 World Cups. His last cap was in the 1999 Rugby World Cup, against Namibia, in Toulouse, on October 24, 1999. He also played for Canada Sevens between 1991 and 1993, including two appearances in the 1993 and 1997 World Cup Sevens. In 2009, he was inducted at the British Columbia Rugby Hall Of Fame.

References

External links 

1968 births
Living people
Canadian expatriate sportspeople in France
Canadian rugby union players
Sportspeople from Vancouver
Canada international rugby union players
University of British Columbia alumni
Rugby union scrum-halves